Super Bowl XXXIII was an American football game played between the American Football Conference (AFC) champion and defending Super Bowl XXXII champion Denver Broncos and the National Football Conference (NFC) champion Atlanta Falcons to decide the National Football League (NFL) champion for the 1998 season. The Broncos defeated the Falcons by the score of 34–19, winning their second consecutive Super Bowl. The game was played on January 31, 1999, at Pro Player Stadium in Miami, Florida (now part of the suburb of Miami Gardens, which became a separate city in 2003).

The defending Super Bowl champion Broncos entered the game with an AFC-best 14–2 regular season record. The Falcons, under former Denver head coach Dan Reeves, were making their first Super Bowl appearance after also posting a 14–2 regular season record.

Aided by quarterback John Elway's 80-yard touchdown pass to receiver Rod Smith, Denver scored 17 consecutive points to build a 17–3 lead in the second quarter from which Atlanta could not recover. In the final game of his career before his announced retirement on May 2, 1999, he completed 18 of 29 passes for 336 yards with one touchdown and one interception, and also scored a 3-yard rushing touchdown.  At 38 years old, Elway became the oldest player to be named Super Bowl MVP, a record that stood until Tom Brady surpassed it in 2017 at the age of 39, coincidentally also against Atlanta.

Background
The NFL originally awarded Super Bowl XXXIII to Candlestick Park in San Francisco on November 2, 1994, at the owners meetings in Rosemont, Illinois but pulled the game away after it became unclear whether planned renovations to the stadium were going to happen.

NFL owners then awarded Super Bowl XXXIII to the Miami area during their October 31, 1996 meeting in New Orleans. Other cities under consideration were Atlanta, Tampa, and Los Angeles. Owners initially planned on selecting only two hosts (XXXIII and XXXIV), but decided to name three after strong showings by the respective delegations. Miami, Atlanta, and Tampa were selected to host XXXIII, XXXIV, and XXXV, respectively. This was the eighth time that the South Florida area hosted the game, and the third at Pro Player Stadium (formerly Joe Robbie Stadium).

Following Super Bowl XXXII, which was played at Qualcomm Stadium in San Diego, Super Bowl XXXIII would mark the last time back-to-back Super Bowls were played outdoors until Super Bowls XLIII, which was held at Raymond James Stadium in Tampa, and XLIV, which was played at Pro Player Stadium, now known as Hard Rock Stadium.

Denver Broncos

Following the Broncos' victory during Super Bowl XXXII the previous season, many wondered if 15-year veteran quarterback John Elway would retire after finally winning a Super Bowl. But Elway decided to stay with Denver and see if he could lead them to a second consecutive championship. Under the leadership of head coach Mike Shanahan, the Broncos stormed to the top of the AFC with a 14–2 regular record in 1998, winning their first 13 games before suffering their first loss to the New York Giants.

The Broncos' offense, under the leadership of Elway and running back Terrell Davis, had another outstanding regular season, ranking second in the NFL with 501 points and third in total offense with 6,276 yards. Davis had one of the greatest seasons of any running back in NFL history, rushing for 2,008 yards, catching 25 passes for 217 yards, and scoring 23 touchdowns to earn him both the NFL Most Valuable Player Award and the NFL Offensive Player of the Year Award. Nevertheless, Davis' rushing numbers did not reduce Elway's passing production. The 38-year-old quarterback made the Pro Bowl for the 3rd year in a row and the 9th time in his career, throwing for 2,806 yards and 22 touchdowns, with only 10 interceptions. A big reason for Elway's passing success was that he had two Pro Bowl wide receivers and a Pro Bowl tight end to throw to. Wide receivers Ed McCaffrey (64 receptions, 1,053 yards and 10 touchdowns) and Rod Smith (86 receptions, 1,222 yards, 6 touchdowns, and 66 rushing yards) provided the team with outstanding deep threats, while tight end Shannon Sharpe (64 receptions, 786 yards and 10 touchdowns) provided a sure-handed target over the middle. The Broncos also had three Pro Bowlers anchoring their offensive line: center Tom Nalen, guard Mark Schlereth, and tackle Tony Jones. On special teams, running back Vaughn Hebron returned 46 kickoffs for 1,216 yards and a touchdown, giving him a 26.4 yards per return average.

The Broncos' defense typically did not get as much attention as their offense, but it was still effective, giving up 308 points (8th fewest in the NFL). Up front, the line was anchored by defensive tackles Maa Tanuvasa and Trevor Pryce, who each recorded 8.5 sacks. Behind them, Pro Bowl linebacker Bill Romanowski recorded 55 tackles, 7.5 sacks, 3 fumble recoveries, and 2 interceptions. The secondary was led by Pro Bowler Steve Atwater and Darrien Gordon, who led the team with 4 interceptions, which he returned for 125 yards and a touchdown. Gordon was also a great punt returner, returning 34 punts for 379 yards.

Atlanta Falcons

The Falcons advanced to their first Super Bowl in franchise history. Like the Broncos, they finished the 1998 regular season with a 14–2 record, including wins in each of their last nine games. Unlike the Broncos, Atlanta's success in 1998 was very surprising to many because they had a 7–9 record in the previous season and a 3–13 record the year before that. In fact, the franchise recorded just four non-losing seasons in the nineteen years prior to 1998, and just two in its previous fifteen.

The Falcons' fortunes began to improve after Dan Reeves became their head coach in 1997. During Reeves' first season with Atlanta, they finished the season 6–2, after starting out 1–7, to compile a 7–9 record overall. Reeves was Denver's head coach from 1981 to 1992, leading the Elway-led Broncos to Super Bowls XXI, XXII, and XXIV. However Elway and the Broncos lost all three, including a 55–10 loss to the San Francisco 49ers in Super Bowl XXIV. Reeves was in constant conflict with his coaching staff and some of his players for the three ensuing seasons. He left Denver in 1993 and spent four seasons as the head coach of the New York Giants before joining the Falcons.

Pro Bowl quarterback Chris Chandler led Atlanta's offense extremely well, throwing for 3,154 yards and 25 touchdowns with just 12 interceptions, while also rushing for 121 yards and 2 touchdowns. Backup quarterback Steve DeBerg (who was Reeves' quarterbacks coach with the Giants in 1995 and 1996) had come out of retirement as a player after 5 years and played in place of an injured Chandler in the October 25 game against the New York Jets. Wide receivers Tony Martin and Terance Mathis provided the team with a superb deep threat, each recording over 60 receptions and 1,100 receiving yards, while also combining for 17 touchdowns. Tight end O.J. Santiago added 27 receptions for 428 yards and 5 scores. However, the biggest threat on offense was Pro Bowl running back Jamal Anderson, who rushed for 1,846 yards, caught 27 passes for 319 yards, and scored 16 total touchdowns. Rookie wide receiver Tim Dwight gave the team a great special teams attack, gaining a total of 1,236 yards and scoring a touchdown on kickoff and punt returns.

The Falcons' defense ranked second in the league for fewest rushing yards allowed (1,203), eighth for fewest total yards allowed (5,009), and fourth for fewest points allowed. Defensive linemen Lester Archambeau (10 sacks, 2 fumble recoveries, 5 forced fumbles), Chuck Smith (8.5 sacks, 4 fumble recoveries, 3 forced fumbles) and Shane Dronett (6.5 sacks, 4 force fumbles) excelled at pressuring quarterbacks and stopping the run. Behind them, Atlanta had two outstanding linebackers, Pro Bowler Jessie Tuggle (65 tackles, 3 sacks, 1 fumble recovery) and Cornelius Bennett (69 tackles, 1 sack, 2 fumble recoveries). Bennett played with the Buffalo Bills when they suffered their four consecutive defeats in Super Bowls XXV, XXVI, XXVII, and XXVIII; and thus was determined to finally get a championship ring that had eluded him in the past. Atlanta's secondary was led by Pro Bowl cornerback Ray Buchanan, who recorded 7 interceptions and 102 return yards, and Pro Bowl safety Eugene Robinson (4 interceptions), who was with the Green Bay Packers when they appeared in Super Bowls XXXI and XXXII.

The season was punctuated by Reeves receiving emergency coronary bypass surgery after Week 14. Doctors said he could have been "within hours of a catastrophic heart attack." Although asked to rest for at least six weeks, Reeves returned to the sidelines for Week 17. Then-defensive coordinator Rich Brooks substituted for Reeves as head coach in Weeks 15 and 16, and won both games.

The Falcons did not return to the Super Bowl until 2016, when they lost 34–28 in overtime to the New England Patriots in Super Bowl LI.

Playoffs

The Broncos demolished the Miami Dolphins 38–3 and beat the New York Jets 23–10 in the playoffs. Meanwhile, the Falcons were victorious against the San Francisco 49ers, 20–18 and then upset the heavily favored 15–1 Minnesota Vikings on the road, 30–27 in overtime.

This was the third Super Bowl in history that featured two teams with two losses or less, and second since the advent of the 16-game schedule. Both teams came into the game with 16–2 records after the playoffs. The first was Super Bowl XII, featuring two 12–2 teams: the Dallas Cowboys and the Denver Broncos. The only Super Bowl featuring a better matchup record-wise was Super Bowl XIX, when the San Francisco 49ers had a 17–1 record and the Miami Dolphins had a 16–2 record.

Super Bowl pregame news
Much of the pregame hype was centered around John Elway confronting his former coach Reeves. Denver head coach Mike Shanahan was hurt and angered by Reeves' pregame assertion that Shanahan and Elway had conspired to have him fired during his stint at Denver. Media coverage also focused on whether or not Elway would retire after the season (which he eventually did).

Elway became the first quarterback to start five Super Bowls; he previously started Super Bowls XXI, XXII, XXIV, and XXXII. Broncos defensive lineman Mike Lodish was making his record sixth appearance in a Super Bowl. He played with Buffalo in all four of their Super Bowl losses (Super Bowl XXV through XXVIII) and with Denver's first Super Bowl win the year before.

On the night before the Super Bowl, Falcons safety Eugene Robinson was arrested for solicitation of prostitution. While driving alone in a rented car along a downtown Miami street, he approached a female undercover police officer posing as a prostitute and offered $40 for oral sex. Although he was released from jail and allowed to play the game, he was widely denounced by the press and fans for the incident. Ironically, on the morning of the day Robinson was arrested for the incident, he had received the Bart Starr Award for his "high moral character."

As the designated home team in the annual rotation between AFC and NFC teams, the Falcons chose to wear their regular black home uniforms with silver pants, with the Broncos going for the road white uniforms and pants.

Broadcasting
The game was broadcast in the United States by Fox and featured the broadcast team of play-by-play announcer Pat Summerall and color commentator John Madden. James Brown hosted all the events with help from his then-fellow Fox NFL Sunday cast members Terry Bradshaw, Howie Long and Cris Collinsworth. Actress Calista Flockhart, then the star of Fox's Ally McBeal, and heavyweight champion Evander Holyfield, both big Falcons fans, were in attendance for the game.

Miami became the first Super Bowl host city to have games televised by all four major American broadcast networks. CBS televised Super Bowls II and X (and later XLI and XLIV), NBC televised Super Bowls III, V, XIII, and XXIII, and ABC televised Super Bowl XXIX.

After the game, Fox aired  the pilot episode of Family Guy, "Death Has a Shadow". Family Guy would become, at the time, only the fourth series to premiere after the Super Bowl and then have a very successful, lengthy run afterwards. The three other successful series that premiered after the Super Bowl were The A-Team after Super Bowl XVII, The Wonder Years after Super Bowl XXII, and Homicide: Life on the Street after Super Bowl XXVII. This was followed by The Simpsons episode "Sunday, Cruddy Sunday".

With this appearance, the Broncos became the first team to play in Super Bowls televised on all four major broadcast networks in the United States. CBS televised the Broncos' losses in Super Bowls XII, XXI, and XXIV (and later their Super Bowl 50 victory), ABC their loss in Super Bowl XXII, and NBC their win in Super Bowl XXXII. The Pittsburgh Steelers became the second with their appearance in Super Bowl XLV, the New York Giants the third with their appearance in Super Bowl XLVI, the San Francisco 49ers the fourth with their appearance in Super Bowl LIV, and the Los Angeles Rams the fifth with their appearance in Super Bowl LVI.

The starting lineups were shown using a virtual television. To television viewers, it appeared as if the end zone opened up and a giant television came up out of the ground. The virtual television displayed video announcing the starting lineups. The virtual television effect was provided by PVI Virtual Media Services using their L-VIS virtual graphics system.

Counterprogramming
During halftime, USA Network aired a special edition of WWF Sunday Night Heat called Halftime Heat featuring a match between The Rock and Mankind for the WWF Championship in an Empty Arena Match that took place in Arizona and had been taped five days before. Mankind won the title, just seven days after losing it to The Rock at the Royal Rumble.

FoxSports.com also ran an online-only Internet halftime show, Webcast live from South Beach Miami, and hosted by then-Fox Sports Net anchorman Keith Olbermann. This halftime show was sponsored by Victoria's Secret and available exclusively in Windows Media Player.  Viewer questions were solicited via the FoxSports.com website.

Entertainment

Pregame ceremonies
The pregame show, narrated by actress Tori Spelling, depicted the adventure of a Caribbean cruise from its festive departure to its journey to exotic destinations. The show included a performance by KISS, along with their trademark elaborate costumes and theatrical pyrotechnics.

Cher later sang the U.S. national anthem.

To honor the 40th anniversary of the 1958 NFL Championship, also known as "The Greatest Game Ever Played", the following participants of that game appeared during the coin toss ceremony: Raymond Berry, Lenny Moore, Jim Parker, Art Donovan, Gino Marchetti, Frank Gifford, Roosevelt Brown, Don Maynard, Sam Huff, and Tom Landry, the defensive coordinator of the New York Giants. Weeb Ewbank, head coach of the Baltimore Colts in that game, was also scheduled to appear, but died November 17, 1998.

Halftime show

The halftime show was titled "A Celebration of Soul, Salsa and Swing" and featured Big Bad Voodoo Daddy, Stevie Wonder, and Gloria Estefan.

Game summary

First quarter
Falcons wide receiver Tim Dwight returned the opening kickoff 31 yards to the Atlanta 37-yard line. Aided by a 25-yard pass interference penalty against Broncos defensive back Steve Atwater and 31 rushing yards from Jamal Anderson, the Falcons then drove to the Broncos’ 8-yard line. However, Broncos linebacker Bill Romanowski sacked quarterback Chris Chandler for a 7-yard loss on third down, forcing Atlanta to settle for Morten Andersen's 32-yard field goal to give them a 3–0 lead.

The Broncos then responded with an 80-yard scoring drive. Quarterback John Elway's 41-yard completion to wide receiver Rod Smith and two receptions by tight end Shannon Sharpe for a total of 26 net yards set up fullback Howard Griffith's 1-yard touchdown run. Unfortunately for Denver, Sharpe was injured on that drive. He did play the next drive, but was taken out of the game after that. Later in the first quarter, Falcons defensive back Ronnie Bradford intercepted a pass from Elway (that had bounced off Sharpe) and returned it to the Broncos 35-yard line.

Second quarter
Denver's defense made a great stand in the opening minutes of the second quarter, tackling Anderson for no gain on 3rd down and 1, and then stopping him for a 2-yard loss on 4th down. Broncos running back Terrell Davis then rushed 4 times for 28 yards and Rod Smith caught an 18-yard pass as the Broncos drove 63 yards in 11 plays to score on Jason Elam's 26-yard field goal to increase their lead to 10–3.

The Falcons then advanced to the Denver 8-yard line on their next drive, but failed to score when Andersen's 26-yard field goal attempt sailed wide right. Immediately after the Broncos got the ball back, Smith broke ahead of Falcons safety Eugene Robinson, caught a pass from Elway, and took off for an 80-yard touchdown reception, giving Denver a 17–3 lead (the fourth 80+ yard touchdown pass play in Super Bowl history). Television viewers did not see most of that play, as Fox was still airing a commercial for The Matrix at the time. Aided by Dwight's 42-yard kickoff return to the 49-yard line, the Falcons responded by driving to Denver's 11-yard line and scored with Andersen's 28-yard field goal to cut Atlanta's deficit to 17–6 going into halftime.

Third quarter
The Broncos opened the second half by driving 74 yards to the Atlanta 20-yard line, but ended up scoring no points after Elam's 38-yard field goal attempt sailed wide right. Chandler responded on the next 2 plays with a 29-yard completion to receiver Tony Martin and a 12-yard scramble to advance the ball to the Denver 41-yard line. However, linebacker John Mobley immediately sacked Chandler for a 6-yard loss, while cornerback Darrius Johnson intercepted Chandler's next pass and returned it 28 yards to the Falcons’ 42-yard line. Denver then drove to the 29-yard line, but Elam missed another field goal attempt, this one from 47 yards.

After the missed field goal, the Falcons drove to the Denver 21-yard line with Anderson's 13-yard run, wide receiver Terance Mathis' 13-yard catch, and a 15-yard run from Anderson, giving them a chance to cut their deficit to within one touchdown. However, Broncos defensive back Darrien Gordon intercepted a pass from Chandler and returned it 58 yards to the Atlanta 24-yard line. Two plays later on 3rd and 6, Elway's 15-yard completion to Ed McCaffrey gave Denver a 1st and goal from the 5-yard line.

Fourth quarter
Griffith took the ball to the end zone from there with two consecutive running plays, the second a 1-yard run to increase Denver's lead to 24–6.

The Falcons reached the Broncos 26-yard line on their ensuing drive, but Gordon intercepted another pass and returned this one 50 yards to the Atlanta 48-yard line. On the next play, Elway completed a short pass to running back Terrell Davis, who turned it into a 39-yard gain. Two plays later, Elway finished the drive with a 3-yard touchdown run, giving the Broncos a 31–6 lead. Elway, who previously ran for scores before in Super Bowls XXI, XXIV, and XXXII, became the second player after Thurman Thomas to score a touchdown in four different Super Bowls.

Dwight returned the ensuing kickoff 94 yards for a touchdown to cut Atlanta's deficit to 31–13, but the Broncos recovered the ensuing onside kick attempt. Three plays later, a 25-yard completion from Elway to McCaffrey set up Elam's 37-yard field goal with just over 7 minutes left in the 4th quarter.

The Falcons' offense advanced inside the Denver 30-yard line for the third consecutive time, with Chandler completing 8 of 14 passes for 67 yards and rushing for 6 yards, and finally scored this time on a 3-yard touchdown pass from Chandler to Mathis. Mathis' touchdown made the score 34–19 (Chandler's pass on the two-point conversion attempt was incomplete), but by then there was only 2:04 left in the game. Atlanta failed to recover the onside kick, but got the ball back on their own 30-yard line with 1:34 left after Denver failed to go for it on 4th down. However, Anderson fumbled at the Broncos 33-yard line, and Broncos defensive back Tyrone Braxton recovered the ball, allowing Denver to run out the clock and win the game. The Broncos' 17 and the Falcons' 13 combined for a Super Bowl record 30 aggregate fourth-quarter points.

The Falcons' offense gained a total of 337 yards, were not penalized once, and drove inside Denver's 30-yard line seven times. Nevertheless, Atlanta's offense scored only 13 points and committed four turnovers. Meanwhile, the Broncos gained a total of 457 yards and scored 34 points.

For the Broncos, Davis rushed for 102 yards and caught 2 passes for 50 yards. Davis' 102 rushing yards in the Super Bowl gave him over 100 rushing yards for the seventh consecutive postseason game (and he was the third player to run for 100 yards in back-to-back Super Bowls, the others being Larry Csonka in Super Bowls VII and VIII, and Emmitt Smith in Super Bowls XXVII and XXVIII). Davis became just the second player to be on a Super Bowl-winning team after being named the NFL Most Valuable Player and leading the league in rushing. Emmitt Smith was the first one, but also was named Super Bowl MVP for Super Bowl XXVIII during that year. Marcus Allen is the only other player to win all three of these honors during his career. Allen won the 1985 NFL MVP Award and rushing title while being named Super Bowl XVIII MVP at the conclusion of the 1983 season. Smith caught 5 passes for 152 yards and a touchdown, an average of 30.4 yards per catch. Gordon recorded 2 interceptions and returned them for a Super Bowl record 108 yards.

For the Falcons, Jamal Anderson rushed for 96 yards and caught 3 passes for 16 yards. Dwight returned 5 kickoffs for 210 yards, the second most in Super Bowl history, and the highest Super Bowl career yards per return average (42.0). Mathis led Atlanta with 7 receptions for 85 yards. Chandler finished the game with 19 out of 35 completions for 219 yards and a touchdown, but was intercepted 3 times.

Dan Reeves became the fourth head coach to lose four Super Bowls, joining Bud Grant, Don Shula, and Marv Levy. Reeves lost Super Bowls XXI, XXII, and XXIV while coaching the Broncos.

Box score

Final statistics
Sources: NFL.com Super Bowl XXXIII, Super Bowl XXXIII Play Finder Den, Super Bowl XXXIII Play Finder Atl, USA Today Super Bowl XXXIII Play by Play

Statistical comparison

Individual statistics

Records set
The following records were set in Super Bowl XXXIII, according to the official NFL.com boxscore, the 2017 NFL Record & Fact Book and the Pro-Football-Reference.com game summary.Some records have to meet NFL minimum number of attempts to be recognized. The minimums are shown (in parenthesis).

Starting lineups
Source:

Officials
 Referee: Bernie Kukar #86 first Super Bowl
 Umpire: Jim Daopoulos #75 first Super Bowl
 Head Linesman: Sanford Rivers #121 first Super Bowl
 Line Judge: Ron Baynes #56 second Super Bowl (XXIX)
 Field Judge: Tim Millis #80 second Super Bowl (XXIX)
 Side Judge: Gary Lane #120 second Super Bowl (XXIII)
 Back Judge: Don Hakes #96 third Super Bowl (XVI, XXX)
 Alternate Referee: Gerald Austin #34 (side judge for XXIV, referee for XXXI and later XXXV)
 Alternate Umpire: Chad Brown #31 (umpire for XXXV and XLV)

Prior to the start of the 1998 NFL season, the league swapped position titles with the field judge and back judge.

References

External links
 Super Bowl official website
 
 
 The Sporting News: History of the Super Bowl (Last accessed December 4, 2005)
 https://www.pro-football-reference.com – Large online database of NFL data and statistics
 Super Bowl play-by-plays from USA Today (Last accessed September 28, 2005)

Super Bowl
Denver Broncos postseason
Atlanta Falcons postseason
1998 National Football League season
American football in Miami
1999 in American football
1999 in sports in Florida
1990s in Miami
Sports competitions in Miami
1999 in American sports
January 1999 sports events in the United States